The 2011 Ontario Scotties Tournament of Hearts was the 2011 edition of the Ontario provincial women's curling championship. It was held January 24–30 at the Thornhill Golf and Country Club in Thornhill, Ontario. The winning team of Rachel Homan represented Ontario at the 2011 Scotties Tournament of Hearts in Charlottetown, Prince Edward Island. The team finished round robin play with a record of 8-3, where they defeated Nova Scotia in the 3-4 page playoff game, but were unsuccessful in the semi-final losing against Saskatchewan, and then losing the Bronze Medal Game to team Nova Scotia.

Teams

Standings

Results

Draw 1
January 24, 7:00 PM ET

Draw 2
January 25, 2:00 PM ET

Draw 3
January 25, 7:00 PM ET

Draw 4
January 26, 2:00 PM ET

Draw 5
January 26, 7:00 PM ET

Draw 6
January 27, 2:00 PM ET

Draw 7
January 27, 7:00 PM ET

Draw 8
January 28, 2:00 PM ET

Draw 9
January 28, 7:00 PM ET

Tie Breaker
January 29, 9:00 AM ET

Playoffs

1 vs. 2
January 29, 2:00 PM ET

3 vs. 4
January 29, 7:00 PM ET

Semifinal
January 30, 9:30 AM ET

Final
January 30, 2:00 PM ET

Qualification
Southern Ontario zones begin November 27, 2010 with zone 7. All other zones will have their playdowns the weekend of December 10. Two teams from each zone qualify to 2 regional tournaments, and two teams from each of the two tournaments qualify to provincials. Two additional teams qualify out of a second chance qualifier.

The Northern Ontario provincial championship will occur December 9–12 in Nipigon, Ontario. Four teams qualify out of the Northern Ontario championship.

Regional Qualifiers In Bold

Southern Ontario Zone Qualification

Zone 1
December 11–12 at the Brockville Country Club, Brockville
Rachel Homan (Ottawa)
Debra Karbashewski (Ottawa) 
Katie Morrissey (Ottawa)

Zone 2
December 11–12 at the Brockville Country Club, Brockville
Tracy Samaan (Rideau) 
Lauren Mann (Rideau)
Christine McCrady (Rideau) (Zone 3 Qualifier)
Ling-Yue Hung (Rideau) 
Laura Payne (Rideau) 
Cheryl McBain (Rideau)

Zone 3
December 10–12 at the Renfrew Curling Club, Renfrew
Jaimee Gardner (Granite of W. Ottawa)

Zone 4
December 10–12 at the Trenton Curling Club, Trenton
Dianne Wylie (Cataraqui) 
Lisa Farnell (Loonie)

Zone 5
December 10–12 at the Bancroft Curling Club, Bancroft
Julie O'Neill (Lindsay)
Angie Melaney (Lakefield) 
Faye Crear (Bobcaygeon) 
Denna Bagshaw (Cannington)

Zone 6
December 11–13 at the Tam Heather Tennis and Curling Club, Toronto
Susan McKnight (Uxbridge) 
Janet McGhee (Port Perry)
Lianne Robertson (Tam Heather)

Zone 7
November 27–28 at the Thornhill Golf and Country Club, Thornhill

Kirsten Wall (Donalda)
Colleen Madonia (Thornhill)
Julie Hastings (Bayview)
Christine Anderson (Leaside)
Bev Wright (Thornhill)
Joanne Heffernan (Bayview)

Zone 8
December 11–15 at the Mississaugua Golf & Country Club, Mississauga
Cathy Auld (Mississaugua)
Kelly Cochrane (High Park)

Zone 9
December 10–12 at the Alliston Curling Club, Alliston
Chrissy Cadorin (Shelburne) 
Alison Goring (North Halton)
Heather Marshall (Brampton) 
Susan Burnside (Chinguacousy)

Zone 10
December 11–12 at the Stroud Curling Club, Stroud
Jacqueline Harrison (Elmvale) 
Sherry Middaugh (Coldwater) 
Jenn Ellard (Bradford) 
Kristeen Wilson (Midland) 
Julie Truscott (Parry Sound)

Zone 11
December 10–12 at the Wiarton Curling Club, Wiarton
Carrie Lindner (Port Elgin)
Kerry Lackie (Port Elgin)

Zone 12
December 10–12 at the Ayr Curling Club, Ayr
Kathy Brown (Guelph Curling)
Tracey Jones (Arthur)
Sheri Smeltzer (Fergus) 
Jen Spencer (Guelph Curling) 
Lisa McLean (K-W Granite)  
Kathy Ryan (K-W Granite)

Zone 13
December 11–12 at the Glanford Curling Club, Mount Hope
Brit O'Neill (Glendale)
Michelle Fletcher (Burlington Curling)

Zone 14
December 10–12 at the Vanastra Curling Club, Vanastra
Kaylene Rundle (Exeter)

Zone 15
December 10–12 at the Tillsonburg and District Curling Club, Tillsonburg
Heather Carr Olmstead (St. Thomas)
Tina Mazerolle (Brant)

Zone 16
December 10–12 at the Ilderton Curling Club, Ilderton
Ruth Alexander (Highland)
Marika Bakewell (Highland)
Lisa Moore (Highland) (Zone 14 Qualifier)
Julie McMullin (Highland)  
Jennifer Scott (Sarnia)

Regions 1 & 2
January  7–9, Royal Gananoque Curling Club

Regions 3&4
January 7–9, St. Thomas Curling Club

Challenge Round
January 14–16, Orangeville Curling Club

Northern Ontario Provincials
December 10–12 at the Nipigon Curling Club, Nipigon, Ontario

Entered teams:

Krista McCarville - Fort William 
Ashley Kallos - Fort William
Marlo Dahl - Port Arthur
Tracy Horgan - Idylwylde
Liane Fossum - Port Arthur
Oye-Sem Won - Fort William
Lisa Rouillard - Sudbury
Rhonda Skillen - Port Arthur

A side 

In the championship game, McCarville defeated Kallos 7-1.

References

Ontario Scotties Tournament Of Hearts, 2011
Ontario
Ontario Scotties Tournament of Hearts
Thornhill, Ontario
Sport in Vaughan
Scotties Tournament of Hearts
Ontario Scotties Tournament of Hearts